Bernard Benstock (1930 – July 14, 1994) was a literary critic and professor of English at the University of Miami and an authority on British mystery writers and Irish writers Seán O'Casey and James Joyce. 

Benstock was editor of the James Joyce Literary Supplement and a co-founder of the International James Joyce Foundation, where he served as president for eight years. He died on July 14, 1994 at the age of 64, in South Egremont, Massachusetts.

Shari Benstock, Bernstock's wife, donated about 1,500 documents of his to the Roberto Ruffilli Library in Forli, Italy.

Major works
 
 
 
 Benstock, Bernard, and Staley, Thomas F., eds. (1976). Approaches to Joyce's Portrait: Ten Essays. Pittsburgh: University of Pittsburgh Press.

References

External links
"Bernard Benstock," English professor, 64" New York Times obituary, July 21, 1994
"Bernard Benstock (1930-1994)," Joyce Studies Annual, Summer 1996

1930 births
1994 deaths
20th-century American non-fiction writers
American academics of English literature
American literary critics
University of Miami faculty